Tonino is an Italian and Spanish given name, surname or nickname. As a given name it is a diminutive form of Antonio in use in Italy, Spain, parts of the United States, Mexico, Cuba, Dominican Republic, Guatemala, Honduras, El Salvador, Nicaragua, Costa Rica, Western Panama, Colombia, Venezuela, Peru, Ecuador, Bolivia, Chile, Paraguay, Argentina, Uruguay, and the Falkland Islands. Notable people with this name include the following:

People
Tonino Accolla (born 1949), Italian actor
Tonino Baliardo, French guitarist (Gipsy Kings)
Tonino Benacquista (born 1961), French author
Tonino Carotone (born 1970), Spanish singer
Tonino Cervi (1929-2002), Italian film director and producer
Tonino Delli Colli (1922-2005), Italian cinematographer
Tonino Guerra (1920–2012), Italian writer and concentration camp survivor
Tonino Picula (born 1961), Croatian politician
Tonino Sorrentino (born 1985), Italian footballer
Tonino Valerii (born 1934), Italian film director
Tonino Viali (1960), Italian runner
Daniel Pérez Moreno (aka "Tonino") (born 1981), Spanish footballer

Other
Don Tonino, Italian television series
Stadio Tonino Benelli, football stadium in Pesaro, Italy

See also

Tony (disambiguation), the English equivalent of Tonino
Tonina (disambiguation)
Tonio (name)
Toñito (name)
Toto (disambiguation), another diminutive of Antonio

Notes

Italian masculine given names
Spanish masculine given names